Michael Kane may refer to:

 Mike Kane (born 1969), British Labour MP
 Michael F. Kane (born 1967), Member of the Massachusetts House of Representatives
 Michael Kane (actor), Canadian actor in The Gunfighters
 Michael Kane (writer), American writer and journalist for several publications
 Michael Kane, the protagonist of the Old Mars novels by Michael Moorcock

See also
 Michael Cain (born 1966), pianist and composer
 Michael Caine (born 1933), actor
 Michael Caines (born 1969), chef